Christian Lotz (born 21 February 1970 in Wuppertal) is a German-American philosopher currently teaching at Michigan State University. Lotz's work primarily focuses on 19th and 20th Century European philosophy (esp. German philosophy), continental aesthetics, critical theory, Marxism, and contemporary European political philosophy.

Academic career
Lotz received his M.A. in philosophy, sociology, and art history from Otto Friedrich University in Bamberg in 1997 and a Ph.D. in philosophy from Philipps University of Marburg in 2002. He was Research Fellow from 2000 to 2002 at Emory University. Lotz taught at Seattle University and The University of Kansas, and held DAAD visiting positions at Brandenburg University of Technology in 2011 and 2013.

Works

Books
 The Art of Gerhard Richter. Hermeneutics, Images, Meaning, London: Bloomsbury Press 2015 (paperback, 2017)
 The Capitalist Schema. Time, Money, and the Culture of Abstraction, Lanham: Lexington Books 2014 (paperback, 2016)
 Christian Lotz zu Karl Marx: Das Maschinenfragment, Hamburg: Laika Verlag 2014
 Ding und Verdinglichung. Technik- und Sozialphilosophie nach Heidegger und der kritischen Theorie, Christian Lotz, Hans Friesen, Markus Wolf, and Jakob Meier (eds.), München: Fink 2012
 From Affectivity to Subjectivity. Husserl’s Phenomenology Revisited, London: Palgrave 2008
 Vom Leib zum Selbst. Kritische Analysen zu Husserl and Heidegger, Freiburg: Alber 2005
 Phenomenology and the Non‐Human Animal. At the Limits of Experience, Christian Lotz and Corinne Painter (eds.), Contributions to Phenomenology, Dordrecht: Springer 2007
 Erinnerung. Philosophische Positionen, Perspektiven und Probleme, Christian Lotz, T.Wolf, and W.Ch. Zimmerli (eds.), München: Fink 2004
 Subjektivität ‐ Verantwortung ‐ Wahrheit. Neue Aspekte der Phänomenologie Edmund Husserls, Christian Lotz and D. Carr (eds.), Frankfurt/M.: Lang 2002.
 Philosophie als Denkwerkzeug. Zur Aktualität transzendentalphilosophischer Argumentation, Christian Lotz, M. Götze, K. Pollok, and D. Wildenburg (eds.), Würzburg: Königshausen&Neumann

Selected essays
 “Lucien Goldmann Redivivus. Categories, History, and Resoluteness in Lukacs and Heidegger,” Metodo, 9/2, 2022, 241-273.
 “Categorial Forms as Intelligibility of Social Objects. Reification and Objectivity in Lukács.,” in Confronting Reification. Revitalizing Georg Lukács’s Thought in Late Capitalism, ed. Gregory R. Smulewicz-Zucker, Leiden: Brill/Chicago: Haymarket Books 2020, 25-47.
 “Marxist Aesthetics, Realism, and Photography. On Brecht’s War Primer.” in Capital in the Mirror:  Critical Social Theory and the Aesthetic Dimension, ed. Daniel Krier and Mark P. Worrell, New York: SUNY Press 2020, 63-88.
 “Gewissen und Widerstand,” in Vernunft und Leben aus transzendentaler Perspektive. Festschrift für Albert Mues zum 80. Geburtstag, ed. Leonhard Möckl, Michael Gerten, Matthias Scherbaum, Würzburg: Königshausen&Neumann 2019, 283-293.
 "Culture Industry," Handbook of Frankfurt School Critical Theory, volume II, ed. Best, Beverly; Bonefeld, Werner; O’Kane, Chris; Larsen, Neil, London: Sage 2018, 973–987.
 "Sensuality, Materiality, Painting. What is Wrong with Jaspers’ and Heidegger's van Gogh Interpretations?," Van Gogh among the Philosophers: Painting, Thinking, Being, ed. David Nichols, Lanham: Lexington Books 2018, 81-97.
 "Gegenständlichkeit. From Marx to Lukacs and Back Again," Theory and Practice: Critical Theory and the Thought of Andrew Feenberg, ed. Darrell Arnold and Michel, Andreas, London: Palgrave 2017, 71–89.
 "Fiction without Fantasy. Capital Fetishism as Objective Forgetting," Continental Thought & Theory, 2, 2017, 364–382.
 “Representing Capital? Mimesis, Realism, and Contemporary Photography,” The Social Ontology of Capitalism, ed. Daniel Krier and Mark P. Worrell, London: Palgrave 2017, 173–193. 
 “Art = Capital? Reflections on Joseph Beuys’ Das Kapital Raum 1970–1977,” Against Value in the Arts and Education, ed. Sam Ladkin, Robert McKay, and Emile Bojesen, Rowman & Littlefield 2016, 93-213.
 “Husserl, Expressionism, and the Eidetic Impulse in Brücke’s Woodcut,” Phenomenology and the Arts, ed. Peter Costello and Licia Carlson, Lanham: Lexington Books 2016, 91-119. 
 “Is Capital a Thing? Remarks on Piketty’s Concept of Capital,” Critical Sociology, 42/2, 2015. 375–383.
 “The Transcendental Force of Money. Social Synthesis in Marx,” Rethinking Marxism, 26/1, 2014, 130–139.
 “Capitalist Schematization. Political Economy, Exchange, and Objecthood in Adorno,” Zeitschrift für Kritische Theorie, 36/37, 2013, 110-123
 “Distant Presence. Representation, Painting and Photography in Gerhard Richter’s Reader,” Symposium. Canadian Journal for Continental Philosophy 1/2012, 87-111
 “Warentausch und Technik als Schematisierung von Gegenständlichkeit bei Adorno und Heidegger,“ in Ding und Verdinglichung. Technik- und Sozialphilosophie nach Heidegger und der kritischen Theorie, ed. Hans Friesen, Christian Lotz, Jakob Meier and Markus Wolf, München: Fink 2012, 191-211 
 “Poetry as Anti-Discourse. Formalism, Hermeneutics, and the Poetics of Paul Celan,” Continental Philosophy Review, 4/2011, 491–510.
 “Representation or Sensation? A Critique of Deleuze’s Philosophy of Painting,” Symposium. Canadian Journal for Continental Philosophy, 13/1, 2009, 59–73.
 “Im-Bilde-sein: Husserls Phänomenologie des Bildbewusstseins,” in Das Bild als Denkfigur. Funktionen des Bildbegriffs in der Philosophiegeschichte von Platon bis Nancy, ed. Sabine Neuber, München: Fink 2010, 167–181.
 “Depiction and Plastic Perception. A Critique of Husserl’s Theory of Picture Consciousness,” in Continental Philosophy Review, 2/2007, 171–185.
 “Existential Idealism? Fichte and Heidegger,” in Epoché, Vol. 12, 1/2007, 109–135.
 “Responsive Life and Speaking To the Other. A Phenomenological Interpretation of Book One of Augustine’s Confessions,” in Augustinian Studies, 37/1, 2006, 89-109.
 “The Events of Morality and Forgiveness: Kant and Derrida,” in Research in Phenomenology, 36/2006, 255–273.
 “Non-Epistemic Self-Awareness. On Heidegger’s Reading of Kant’s Practical Philosophy,” in Journal of the British Society of Phenomenology, Vol 36, No. 1, 2005.
 “Recollection, Mourning and the Absolute Past: Husserl, Freud and Derrida,” in New Yearbook for Phenomenology and Phenomenological Philosophy, Vol.3, Nr. 4, 2004, 121–141.

External links
 MSU Faculty Page

References 

Living people
German philosophers
Michigan State University faculty
Continental philosophers
1970 births
German male writers